TeddyLoid is a Japanese electronic music producer and DJ. He is known for producing many songs in the soundtrack of Panty & Stocking with Garterbelt, which charted on Oricon Albums Chart. He is also known for partnering with Daoko in "ME!ME!ME!", an anime music video submitted to the 2014 Japan Animator Expo.

Career 
TeddyLoid’s career first began by publishing remixes on MySpace, where he gained popularity and climbed to the top of the platform's electronic indie chart. In 2008, he toured internationally as Miyavi's background DJ in the guitarist's "This Iz The Japanese Kabuki Rock Tour 2008".

TeddyLoid's first partnership with Taku Takahashi came when Takahashi created his record label, TCY Records. In the record label's debut album, TCY Recordings Sampler Vol.0, TeddyLoid produced the song "Another Day". The two then worked together on the soundtrack for the anime series Panty & Stocking with Garterbelt, with TeddyLoid producing multiple songs. The soundtrack album, Panty & Stocking with Garterbelt The Original Soundtrack, reached 10th on the Oricon Albums Chart, while its follow-up album Panty & Stocking with Garterbelt The Worst Album also reached 24th. In 2011, he formed Galaxias! along with vocalist Ko Shibasaki and music producer Deco*27. The three produced one album titled Galaxias! and toured Japan, including a concert at Nippon Budokan.

On 17 September 2014, TeddyLoid released his first album, Black Moon Rising. Then, for the 2014 Japan Animator Expo, TeddyLoid produced "ME!ME!ME!", an anime music video featuring vocals from Daoko and visuals from Hibiki Yoshizaki. The music was written in three parts and the video notable for its sexual content featured a male protagonist in a psychedelic setting featuring nude women, which have become a viral hit. A follow-up remix titled "Me!Me!Me! Chronic" was released in May 2015. In 2015, TeddyLoid partnered with Momoiro Clover Z and released Re:Momoiro Clover Z, which featured remixes of the idol group's songs. He then released Silent Planet later the same year and began releasing a series of follow-up extended plays under the same title. Each release featured different artists including Kohh, Bonjour Suzuki, Chyanmina, Aina the End, and IA. The series then cumulated in two albums, Silent Planet: Reloaded and Silent Planet: Infinity.

In 2016, TeddyLoid was the fifth most listened to Japanese artist outside of Japan on Spotify. Also in 2016, TeddyLoid made his first American performance in Milwaukee, Wisconsin as a DJ for a concert at Anime MKE. 

In 2018, he worked with virtual youtuber Kizuna AI to produce the single "melty world", which he later remixed himself in 2020 to produce a "black" version of the title to sound like it was sung by Kizuna AI's cynical alternate ego, Kizuna AI Black.

In 2022, he made his debut in the rhythm game ‘Arcaea’ with the song ‘Defection’, with DELTA on vocals.

Discography

Albums

Extended plays

Singles

Other notable works

References 

Japanese DJs
Japanese electronic musicians
Japanese record producers
Electronic dance music DJs
1989 births
Living people
Musicians from Shizuoka Prefecture